Nepal Pyaro Chha aka Lovely Nepal (International: English title) is a 2001 Nepali film directed by Shambhu Pradhan.

Cast
 Rajesh Hamal
 Jal Shah
 Ramesh Uprety
 Ishwori Pradhan
 Arjun Shrestha
 Dinesh Sharma

See also

 Cinema of Nepal
 List of Nepalese films

External links
 

2001 films
Nepalese drama films
2000s Nepali-language films
2001 drama films

ne:झरना बज्राचार्य